Nature's Touch is a 1914 American silent short film directed by Sydney Ayres. Starring  William Garwood and Jack Richardson.

Cast
William Garwood
Louise Lester
Joseph Melville
Billie O'Brien
Jack Richardson
Vivian Rich
Harry von Meter

External links

1914 films
American silent short films
American black-and-white films
Films directed by Sydney Ayres
1910s American films